"If You Can Dream" is the first song that was originally written and recorded specifically for the Disney Princess media franchise. It was written, produced, and arranged by Robbie Buchanan and Jay Landers. It was first released on the album Disney Princess: The Ultimate Song Collection.

The song is sung from the point of view of the first eight official Disney Princesses. It has been featured on several Disney music CDs, and its music video was present on nearly every Disney Princess DVD, as either an extra or a Sing-Along and was shown several times on Disney Channel.

The song has been covered by teen country singer Ashley Gearing, and a shorter altered version performed by a different set of singers was featured in the Disney on Ice show Princess Wishes as the show finale from 2006 to 2018. More recently, it serves as the exit song to Disneyland Paris' nighttime show Disney Illuminations.

Singers
Susan Stevens Logan as Snow White and Cinderella
Christie Houser as Aurora
Jodi Benson as Ariel
Paige O'Hara as Belle
Judy Kuhn as Pocahontas
Lea Salonga as Jasmine and Mulan

Song details
One of the most notable aspects of the song is that all but three of the princesses's original voice actresses reprise their singing roles. Adriana Caselotti, Ilene Woods, and Mary Costa do not reprise their roles as Snow White, Cinderella, and Aurora.  Lea Salonga, who provided the singing voice of both Jasmine and Mulan reprised both roles in this song.

Each princess sings lyrics that reference their own story. For example, one of Cinderella's lines is "One day the slipper fits, then you see the love in his eyes," one of Belle's lines is "So the story goes, never die the rose...," Pocahontas' primary line being "The colors of the wind will lead my heart right back to you..." and Jasmine's line being "There's a whole new world waiting there for us".

In the Princess Wishes Disney on Ice show, the line "The colors of the wind will lead my heart right back to you," is changed to "The music of the wind will lead my heart right back to you," since Pocahontas is absent from the show.  The show also changes the lines from "So the story goes/Never die the rose" to "Once upon a dream/Wish and it will seem".  While these lines were originally sung by Belle, they altered ones were given to Aurora in order for her to have a solo part.

Music video
The music video for the song consists of footage arranged in a montage from the films the featured girls are originally from including Snow White and the Seven Dwarfs, Cinderella, Sleeping Beauty, The Little Mermaid, Beauty and the Beast, Aladdin, Pocahontas and Mulan. The footage is edited by Industrial Light & Magic in an attempt to make the princesses mouth movements lipsync with their respective song vocals.

References
http://www.ultimatedisney.com/princess-party.html
http://www.disneyprincess.com

Disney Princess
Disney songs
2004 singles
2004 songs
2000s ballads
Pop ballads
American songs
American pop songs
Song recordings produced by Robbie Buchanan
Songs about dreams
Songs written by Robbie Buchanan
Songs written by Jay Landers
Theme music
Walt Disney Records singles